Blaine Ridge-Davis (born 7 May 1999) is a British track cyclist and BMX cyclist.

Cycling career
Ridge-Davis is a double British team champion after winning the team sprint Championship at the 2019 British National Track Championships and 2020 British National Track Championships.

As part of a British quartet including Milly Tanner, Sophie Capewell and Lauren Bate, Ridge-Davis won team sprint bronze at the UCI Track World Championships in Roubaix, France.

References

External links

1999 births
Living people
British female cyclists
British track cyclists
Cyclists at the 2022 Commonwealth Games
Commonwealth Games competitors for England
21st-century British women